Meleko Mokgosi (born 1981) is an artist and associate professor of painting and drawing at the School of Art at Yale University. His work includes large-scale paintings that explore themes of colonialism, democracy, nationalism, and life in Southern Africa.

Early life and education
Mokgosi was born in 1981 in Francistown, Botswana, and raised by his mother and grandmother in the city of Maun. He began drawing in primary school. While in high school, he became interested in the potential of making political commentary with art. In 2003, he moved to the United States, participated in the Whitney Independent Study Program, and studied art at Williams College and University of California, Los Angeles (UCLA), earning B.A. and Master of Fine Arts degrees. Mokgosi studied for four years with American conceptual artist Mary Kelly, who guided him in developing a project-based practice, which he described as "focused not on producing objects but articulating a set of questions".

Career
From 2008–2011 Mokgosi created his first series of paintings, Pax Afrikaner, which explored xenophobia and national identity in southern Africa.

In 2012, Mokgosi was an artist-in-residence at the Studio Museum in Harlem. There he worked on completing his Pax Kaffraria painting series, which he explained was "to explore how people in southern Africa think about nationhood." Mokgosi made a series of more than 50 paintings on the subject of colonialism in Africa. A book on the Pax Kaffraria project was published by the Hammer Museum in 2014.

In 2014, Mokgosi began the eight-chapter project Democratic Intuition, which he described as being about "how do normal people understand, reciprocate, have access to, and not have access to the ideas of democracy and the democratic". He presented the first two chapters of this work at his first solo New York exhibition in 2016.

Meleko Mokgosi also co-founded (with Avram Alpert and Anthea Behm) The Interdisciplinary Art and Theory Program in New York in 2018: an exclusive education programme for fine arts practitioners aimed at facilitating the investigation of various knowledge frameworks in the world of the arts.

Style 
There are two distinct approaches in Meleko Mokgosi’s paintings.

In projects such as 'Wall of Casbah' (2009–2014), and 'Modern Art: The Root of African Savages' (2012–2016) he takes a text-based approach. This involves reproducing museum labels on canvas with annotations to highlight the inherent cultural bias and colonial power dynamics in these supposedly neutral educational materials.

Other projects like Pax Afrikaner and Pax Kaffraria are figurative and draw from visual sources such as European history painting and cinematic imagery. These works combine a range of imagery, tropes and symbols, to bring a critical eye to aspects of national identity, colonial history and post-colonial legacies within Southern Africa. Mokgosi frequently incorporates Setswana text in his paintings—an approach, he discusses in Ocula Magazine, that 'creates the conditions of de-centring viewers who do not know the language, and therefore points to the asymmetrical nature of globalisation, which always tilts in favour of the Western viewer.'

Honors and awards
 2012 – Inaugural Mohn Award, Hammer Museum
 2017 – Vilcek Prize for Creative Promise in Fine Arts

References

External links

Living people
1981 births
Painters from New York City
Botswana emigrants to the United States
New York University faculty
University of California, Los Angeles alumni
Williams College alumni
People from Francistown
Botswana painters
21st-century American painters